The Awori is a tribe of the Yoruba people speaking a distinct dialect of the Yoruba language.

Geographic extent

Traditionally, the Awori people are found in Ogun State and Lagos State, Nigeria. Towns including Ado-Odo, Isheri, Ota, Igbesa, Agbara, Ilobi, Tigbo are all Awori settlements within today's Ogun State (created 1976) in Nigeria.

Origin story

The story is that Olofin (or Ogunfunminire, founder of the Awori) and his followers left the palace of King Oduduwa (founder of the Yoruba) in Ile-Ife and migrated southward along a river. Oduduwa had given Olofin a mud plate and instructed him to place it on the water and follow it until it sank into the river.

Several days after leaving Ile-Ife, the plate suddenly stopped near Olokemeji near present-day Abeokuta. After seventeen days, it began moving again, only to stop at Oke-Ata for another seventeen days. At the end of seventeen days, the plate began moving again, only to stop again on the southern outskirts of present-day Abeokuta, where it stayed for another seventeen days. At this location, some of Olofin's followers decided to remain, led by a man named Osho Aro-bi-ologbo-egan. The plate continued downriver, stopping again at Isheri. Olofin began instructing his followers to begin setting up a permanent settlements. Olofin's followers are said to have asked him where the plate was. He answered "Awo Ti Ri" meaning "The plate has sunk". This is how the name Awori is said to have come into being.

Olofin had two wives named Akesan and Ajaiye. Akesan had two sons (Ogunneru and Ogunbiyi), while Ajaiye was barren. After they settled in Isheri, Olofin consulted the Ifa oracle where they were told to proceed to a place where there was salt water. They left Isheri and ended up at Iddo, where they stayed. Ajaiye eventually gave birth to 8 children, who would eventually grow up to be the present day Idejos. He gave them lands to farm. The Idejos include Aromire, Ojora, Onikoyi, Oniru, Oluwa, Oloto, Olumegbon and Elegushi.
Olofin would eventually go back to Isheri to live out the rest of his life after cutting off Ajaiye's head for betraying him to the Benin people.

Ogunneru eventually succeeded Olofin Ogunfunminire as the next Olofin of Isheri while Ogunbiyi will go on to birth new Awori towns. His son was the first King of Ota.

History

The settlement of the Awori clan is known to have preceded the establishment of Abeokuta as an Egba kingdom in 1832, as Isheri, the foremost Awori town within present day Ogun State was settled in the 15th century.

Traditions are consistent about the presence of a distinct Yoruba sub-group around Lagos by about 1550 when the Benin Empire invaded the region of Lagos.

An anthropologist, W.G. Wormalin in his Intelligence Report on the Badagry district of the colony (1935) gives a graphic description of the early Awori he encountered when he writes that:" They speak a slurred dialect of the Yoruba language. They mostly engage in farming and fishing."

Religion
Traditional beliefs and practice exist side-by-side Islam and Christianity. Some of the Awori combined Islam or Christianity with their traditional beliefs and practices. Islam was introduced to different parts of Aworiland before the twentieth century by Muslim clerics from the hinterland, while the diffusion of Christianity followed missionary activities in the region of Badagry from the 1840s. The use of Ifa oracle in the determination of certain issues and events such as date of festival, coronation ceremony, causes of state calamity is in practice among traditional believers. A person's future and fortune remained an important aspect of Yoruba civilisation, which the Awori still retain. In addition, the institutions of priesthood and palace society for which the Yoruba of the interior are famous featured prominently between them. For instance, the possession of Ade crown and recognition of Oba, which is the highest conception of political authority among the Yoruba, is what every tradition leader; especially those from royal lineages in Aworiland aspire to.

Traditional Festival
Oro and Oree, Egungun, Elegba, Igumuko, Opa, Osugbo and Gelede festivals among the traditional Sword communities are celebrated as people celebrate modern Sallah and Christmas with indigenes trooping back home from far and near when dates are fixed.

Economy
Due to the nature of the geographical environment, fishing, rather than farming which is traditionally with the Yoruba, is the major traditional preoccupation of the seaside. Awori are also great farmers. In some regions, fishing is combined with mat and basket production and palm oil. The climatic variation north of the coast offers an opportunity for the cultivation of a variety of crops. Cassava is probably the most widely cultivated as it could be planted and harvested throughout the year. In addition, it is a source of Garri, which now constitute a major staple food. Cassava is also processed for the production of starch and a locally produced starchy food known as Fufu and other confectionaries. Maize, Yams, Cocoyams and Oil Palm are also popular crops produced in the region. The food crops are supplemented by vegetables as well as animals such as goats, sheep and rabbits; birds like quail, cock, hen and goose, edible insects such as termites as well as alligators, which are prepared as a delicacy known as 'Ònì' among the Aworis of Lagos State.

However, with the industrial revolution pioneered by the Obafemi Awolowo government in the late 1950s and 1960s, the Awori-speaking areas like Ikeja and Isolo in Lagos, as well as Otta and Agbara began to see a concentration of industries, for which the indigenes surrendered their land for the economic transformation of their communities.

References

   

Yoruba subgroups
History of Lagos